The Rural Cemetery and Friends Cemetery are a pair of connected cemeteries at 149 Dartmouth Street in New Bedford, Massachusetts United States. Established in 1837, the Rural Cemetery was the fifth rural cemetery in the nation, after Mount Auburn Cemetery (Cambridge, Massachusetts), Mount Hope Cemetery (Bangor, Maine), Mount Pleasant Cemetery (Taunton, Massachusetts), and Laurel Hill Cemetery (Philadelphia, Pennsylvania). In its early days it was criticized as lacking some of the natural beauty afforded by rolling terrain; the early sections were laid out in rectilinear manner on relatively flat terrain. The cemetery was a popular burial site, including notably the landscape artist Albert Bierstadt and Governor of Massachusetts John H. Clifford.

In contrast to the more decorative nature of the Rural Cemetery, the Friends Cemetery is much plainer.  It consists of a roughly  parcel on one side of the Rural Cemetery, which was sold to the Dartmouth Friends in 1849, but is administered by the city.  This section has less ornate markers, generally laid out in rectilinear fashion.  It includes burials that were relocated from a Friends cemetery (dating to 1793) that had been located on the New Bedford waterfront.

The cemeteries were listed on the National Register of Historic Places in 2014.

See also
National Register of Historic Places listings in New Bedford, Massachusetts

References

Cemeteries on the National Register of Historic Places in Massachusetts
Cemeteries in Bristol County, Massachusetts
Buildings and structures in New Bedford, Massachusetts
National Register of Historic Places in New Bedford, Massachusetts
Rural cemeteries
Cemeteries established in the 1830s
1837 establishments in Massachusetts